Cathal mac Domhnall Ó Conchobair (died 1324) was King of Connacht from 1318 to 1324.  The Kings of Connacht were rulers of the cóiced (variously translated as portion, fifth, province) of Connacht, which lies west of the River Shannon, Ireland. However, the name only became applied to it in the early medieval era, being named after The Connachta.

Family

Cathal's wife was Ailbhe and his daughter was Sadhbh (d.1373). Sadhbh married firstly Flaithbheartach mac Domnall Carrach O’Rourke, King of Breifne O’Rourke from 1346 to 1349 (d.1352) and secondly Niall Mág Samhradháin, chief of the McGovern Clan of Tullyhaw, County Cavan from 1340 until his death in 1359. Sadhbh's sons with Niall were Tighearnán Mór, Ruadhrí, Eóghan and CúChonnacht.

References

 Byrne, Francis John (2001), Irish Kings and High-Kings, Dublin: Four Courts Press, 
 Gaelic and Gaelised Ireland, Kenneth Nicols, 1972.
 The Second Battle of Athenry, Adrian James Martyn, East Galway News & Views, 2008–2009

1324 deaths
Kings of Connacht
14th-century Irish monarchs
People from County Roscommon
Cathal
Year of birth unknown